Arina Pavlovna Openysheva (born 24 March 1999) is a Russian competitive swimmer. She won eight medals at the 2015 European Games. Seven medals were gold (200 m freestyle, 400 m freestyle, 4 × 100 m freestyle, 4 × 200 m freestyle, 4 × 100 m medley, 4 × 100 m mixed freestyle, 4 × 100 m mixed medley) making her the most decorated athlete of the Games.

Career
In 2013, Openysheva competed at the 2013 European Youth Summer Olympic Festival taking 8 gold medals overall in (100 m, 200 m, 400 m, 800 m, 4 × 100 m freestyle, 4 × 100 m medley, 4 × 100 m mixed freestyle and 4 × 100 m mixed medley).

In 2014, at the 2014 European Junior Championships, Openysheva won 8 gold medals in (100 m, 200 m, 400 m freestyle, 4 × 100 m freestyle, 4 × 200 m freestyle, 4 × 100 m medley, 4 × 100 m mixed freestyle and 4 × 100 m mixed medley). That same year, she competed in seniors at the 2014 European Championships and at the 2014 FINA World Swimming Championships (25 m) in Doha, Qatar.

In June 2015, 16-year-old Openysheva competed at the inaugural 2015 European Games in Baku, she won seven gold medals including in 200 m freestyle, 400 m freestyle, and helping the Russian Team win gold in 4 × 200 m freestyle, 4 × 100 m mixed medley, 4 × 100 m mixed freestyle, 4 × 100 m freestyle and in 4 × 100 m medley (together with Mariia Kameneva, Maria Astashkina, Polina Egorova broke a new junior world record touching in at 4:03.22). She won silver in 100 m freestyle behind Dutch Marrit Steenbergen. Openysheva was the most decorated athlete at the entire 2015 European Games.

In 2–9 August, Openysheva competed in seniors at the 2015 World Championships in Kazan, however she did not reach the semifinals in her events after losing in the preliminary heats. She also competed at the FINA Swimming World Cup in Moscow, finishing 4th in the women's 100 m freestyle behind Veronika Popova.

In 25–30 August, Openysheva then competed at the 2015 World Junior Swimming Championships in Singapore, she won gold in 4 × 100 m mixed medley (with Anton Chupkov, Irina Pridhoko and Daniil Pakhomov) were Russia threw in a new Junior World record touching in at 3:45.85, she won silver medals in 4 × 100 m freestyle and 200 m freestyle, bronze medals in 100 m freestyle, 4 × 100 m mixed freestyle and 4 × 200 m freestyle.

References

External links

Arina Openysheva Sports bio

1999 births
Living people
Sportspeople from Krasnoyarsk
Russian female freestyle swimmers
Russian female medley swimmers
Olympic swimmers of Russia
Swimmers at the 2016 Summer Olympics
European Games gold medalists for Russia
European Games medalists in swimming
Swimmers at the 2015 European Games
European Games silver medalists for Russia
Medalists at the FINA World Swimming Championships (25 m)
Universiade medalists in swimming
European Aquatics Championships medalists in swimming
Universiade gold medalists for Russia
Universiade silver medalists for Russia
Universiade bronze medalists for Russia
Medalists at the 2017 Summer Universiade